Rainmaker was a visual effects and post-production company headquartered in Vancouver, Canada, with an office in Los Angeles, California, United States, which contributed to the final works for feature films, television shows, commercials and video games. It acquired and folded into Mainframe Studios in 2007.

History
Vancouver-based post-production firm Rainmaker Income Fund which owned Rainmaker Digital Effects announced its acquisition of a 62% stake in Mainframe Entertainment from IDT Corporation on 20 July 2006 for $13.8 million. The next month, Rainmaker announced it would acquire the remaining 38% of the company. On 30 January 2007, Mainframe rebranded as Rainmaker Animation. Rainmaker Income Fund announced on 29 August 2006, that RNK Capital L.P. would acquire the remaining 38% stake and merge into Rainmaker Income Fund. After the merger, Rainmaker announced on 31 January 2007 that Rainmaker Animation's name would be changed to Rainmaker Entertainment. On November 29, 2007, Rainmaker Income Fund announced the sale of Rainmaker Visual Effects and Rainmaker Post to Deluxe Entertainment Services Group, leaving only the animation business which it would fold into weeks later.

Divisions
The company had three divisions: Rainmaker Animation, Rainmaker Visual Effects and Rainmaker Post.   
Rainmaker Animation (now Mainframe Studios); creation of 3D animation for feature films, television films and outsources CGI animation to film and television studios.
Rainmaker Visual Effects (now Method Studios Vancouver); provision of CGI effects for feature film, television, commercials, and video games.
Rainmaker Post (now Encore Post Vancouver); provision of post-production services including traditional film lab processes, digital image processing, and HD.

Film and television credits
Rainmaker created special effects scenes for films such as I, Robot, Armageddon, and The Da Vinci Code, as well as television series such as Stargate SG-1, Stargate Atlantis and Smallville.

References

External links
 (for the animation department)
Official Website for Method Studios (formerly Rainmaker Visual Effects) 
Official website for Encore (formerly Rainmaker Post) 

Visual effects companies
1993 establishments in British Columbia
2007 disestablishments in British Columbia